The 1969 Ohio State Buckeyes football team represented the Ohio State University in the 1969 Big Ten Conference football season. The defending national champion Buckeyes compiled an 8–1 record.

Top-ranked all season, the Buckeyes lost the rivalry game at Michigan on November 22 and dropped to fourth in the final AP Poll. There was no bowl game for Ohio State, because prior to the 1975 season, the Big Ten and Pac-8 conferences allowed only one postseason participant each, for the Rose Bowl, and prior to 1972, a team could not represent the Big Ten in the Rose Bowl in consecutive seasons.

Schedule

Depth chart

Coaching staff
 Woody Hayes – Head Coach (19th year)
 Earle Bruce – Offense (4th year)
 George Chaump – Offense (2nd year)
 Hugh Hindman –  (7th year)
 Rudy Hubbard – Running Backs (2nd year)
 Dave McClain –  (1st year)
 Lou McCullough – Defensive Coordinator (2nd year)
 John Mummey – Quarterbacks (1st year)
 Dick Walker – Defensive Backs (1st year)

Game summaries

TCU

    
    
    
    
    
    
    
    
    

Jim Otis 27 Rush, 121 Yds
Ohio State's biggest win since 1957 versus Indiana and most points scored in a game since 1950 versus Iowa.

Washington

Michigan State

    
    
    
    
    
    
    
    
    
    
    

Attendance: 86,641 (record)
Rex Kern 10/21, 187 Yds, 2 TD, 2 rush TD (left early in 4th)

Minnesota

Illinois

Northwestern

Wisconsin

Purdue

Michigan

1970 NFL draftees

References

Ohio State
Ohio State Buckeyes football seasons
Big Ten Conference football champion seasons
Ohio State Buckeyes football